Boca Raton is a city in Palm Beach County, Florida, United States. It was first incorporated on August 2, 1924 as "Bocaratone," and then incorporated as "Boca Raton" on May 26, 1925. The population was 97,422 in the 2020 census, and it was ranked as the 344th largest city in the United States in 2022. However, approximately 200,000 additional people with a Boca Raton postal address live outside of municipal boundaries, such as in West Boca Raton. As a business center, the city experiences significant daytime population increases.

While the area had been inhabited by the Glades culture, as well as Spanish and later British colonial empires prior to its annexation by the United States, the city's present form as a resort town was developed predominantly by Addison Mizner starting in the 1920s. Mizner's influence contributed to many buildings in the area having a Mediterranean Revival or Spanish Colonial Revival architectural theme. Boca Raton was also the home of large pineapple farms operated by Japanese immigrants up until they were confiscated during the American entry into World War II in order to become an Army Air Force base. Boca Raton also became a key city in the development of the early computer industry. The city is the birthplace of IBM's first personal computer and various other technologies created by the company.

Still centered around luxury beach culture, the city today is dotted by many malls and shopping centers. The Boca Raton economy is also the home market of the ODP Corporation, which operates Office Depot and OfficeMax. Boca Raton is home to the main campus of Florida Atlantic University and the Evert Tennis Academy, owned by former professional tennis player Chris Evert. Boca Raton is also known for its strict development code for the size and types of commercial buildings, building signs, and advertisements that may be erected within the city limits. This has led to major thoroughfares without billboards and large advertisements, as well as increased green spaces on roads.

Etymology
Boca Ratón translates to English literally as Mouse Mouth. Its name was originally labeled in the first European maps of the area as "Boca de Ratones". "Boca", meaning mouth in Spanish, was a common term to describe an inlet on maps by sailors. The true meaning of the word "ratones" for the area is more uncertain. Some claim that the word "ratones" appears in old Spanish maritime dictionaries referring to "rugged rocks or stony ground on the bottom of some ports and coastal outlets, where the cables rub against." Thus, one possible translation of "Boca Raton" is "rugged inlet". Still other people claim that "ratones" referred to pirates who hid out in the area, and thus the name could translate to "pirates' inlet", which would illustrate why there is a pirate ship in the city seal.

Pronunciation

History

Timeline

Early history

The area where Boca Raton is now located was originally occupied by the Glades culture, a Native American tribe of hunter/gatherers who relocated seasonally and between shellfish sources, distinct from the Tequesta to the south and the Jaega to the north.

What Spanish voyagers called "Boca de Ratones" was originally to the south, in present-day Biscayne Bay in Miami-Dade County. The area of Boca Raton was labeled "Rio Seco", meaning "Dry River", during this time. By mistake during the 19th century, mapmakers moved this location to the north and began referring to the city's lake, today known as Lake Boca Raton, as "Boca Ratone Lagoon" and later "Boca Ratone Sounde." An inland stream near the lake was later renamed Spanish River, and eventually became part of the Intracoastal Waterway.

When Spain surrendered Florida to Britain in 1763, the remaining Tequestas, along with other Indians who had taken refuge in the Florida Keys, were evacuated to Cuba. In the 1770s, Bernard Romans reported seeing abandoned villages in the area, but no inhabitants.

The area remained largely uninhabited for long afterwards, during the early years of Florida's incorporation in the United States. The first significant European settler to this area was Captain Thomas Moore Rickards in 1895, who resided in a house made of driftwood on the east side of the East Coast Canal, south of what is now the Palmetto Park Road bridge. He surveyed and sold land from the canal to beyond the railroad north of what is now Palmetto Park Road. Early settlement in the area increased shortly after Henry Flagler's expansion of the Florida East Coast Railway, connecting West Palm Beach to Miami.

Addison Mizner's resort town

 1890 – Bocaratone settled.
 1896 – Florida East Coast Railway begins operating.
 1909 – Bocaratone becomes part of newly created Palm Beach County.
 1912 – Intracoastal Waterway opens.
 1915
 Telephone installed.
 Board of Trade organized.
 1918 – Ebenezer Baptist Church founded in Pearl City neighborhood.
 1923 – Boca Raton Inlet bridge constructed.
 1924
 Town of "Boca Ratone" incorporated.
 Addison Mizner chosen as town planner.
 George Long becomes mayor.
 1925
 Town of "Boca Raton" incorporated.
 Mizner Development Corporation in business.
 1926
 Cloister resort built.
 Chamber of Commerce founded.
 1927 – Town Hall built.
 1928 – Water plant built.
 1930
 Railroad station built.
 Population: 447.
 1936 – Airport established.
 1939 – Camino Real Bridge opens.
 1942 – U.S. military Boca Raton Army Air Field established.
 1947 – October: 1947 Cape Sable hurricane occurs.
 1950
 Art Guild established.
 Population: 992.
 1955 – Boca Raton News begins publication.
 1960 – Population: 6,961.
 1961
 Florida Atlantic University founded.
 Boca Raton Public Library building constructed.
 1962
 Lynn University established.
 Saint Andrew's School opens.
 1963 – Boca Inlet Bridge opens.
 1964 – Boca Raton Theatre in business.
 1970 – Population: 28,506.
 1972 – Boca Raton Historical Society founded.
 1979 – Jewish Floridian of South County newspaper begins publication.
 1980 
 Pope John Paul II High School established.
 Town Center at Boca Raton opens. 
 1981 – August: "IBM (International Business Machines) introduces the IBM PC from its Boca Raton factory."
 1986 – Boca Raton Museum of Art active.
 1989 – Boca Raton station opens.
 1990
 Old Floresta designated a city historic district.
 Population: 61,492.
 1991 – W.R. Grace & Co. headquarters relocated to Boca Raton from New York.
 1998 – City website online (approximate date).
 1999 – W.R. Grace & Co. headquarters moves away from Boca Raton.
 2000
 Muvico cinema in business.
 Population: 83,255
 2001 – Anthrax attack; Robert Stevens dies.
 2004 – September: Hurricane Frances and Hurricane Jeanne occur.
 2005 – October: Hurricane Wilma occurs.
 2009 – Boca Raton News ceases publication.
 2010 – Population: 84,392.
 2012
 October 22: United States presidential debate held in Boca Raton.
 2014 – Susan Haynie elected mayor.
 2017
 Ted Deutch becomes U.S. representative for Florida's 22nd congressional district.
 September: Hurricane Irma occurs.
Boca Raton as a city was the creation of architect Addison Mizner. Prior to him, Boca Raton was an unincorporated farming town with a population of 100 in 1920.

In 1925, Mizner announced his plan for "the foremost resort city on the North American continent," "a new exclusive social capital in America." After spending several years in Palm Beach, where, in his own words, he "did more than any one man to make the city beautiful," and designed the Everglades Club among many other buildings, in Boca Raton his plan was to create from scratch "a resort as splendid in its entirety as Palm Beach is in spots."

Activity in that area began at least a year, and probably more, before Mizner's announcement. Land acquisition, tens of thousands of acres, was the largest part. But it is hard not to see Mizner's hand in the incorporation of Boca Raton in 1924; the city immediately appointed him Town Planner. The Mizner Development Company was incorporated in 1925, and promptly issued $5 million of stock, which was fully subscribed in less than a week. $500,000 was reserved for the "average Floridian"; the remainder was purchased by, as Addison called them, "noted personages", all with a Palm Beach connection: Lytle Hall, Harold Vanderbilt, J. Leonard Repogle, the Duchess of Sutherland, Rodman Wanamaker, Paris Singer, Irving Berlin, Madame Frances Alda, W. C. Robinson, H. H. Rodgers, D. H. Conkling, A. T. Herd, Porte, William Kissam Vanderbilt II, Elizabeth Arden, Jesse Livermore, Clarence H. Geist, and T. Coleman du Pont as chairman. Addison's brother Wilson also appears on the list of investors, but he had little to invest.

Instead of the existing Palmetto Park Road, the main street in Mizner's Boca was to be El Camino Real, 20 lanes wide, which Mizner fancifully translated as "The Royal Highway", referring to Spain's road network and to the road to Santa Fe and to the Spanish missions in California. (Spanish kings rarely or never travelled on these roads; "The Government Road" would be just as accurate.) It was originally to be circular, with a lagoon in the middle. (In the drawing of it on the cover of Mizner Development's first brochure is a Venetian gondola.) His statement that it was inspired by Botafogo, a neighborhood and beach in Rio de Janeiro, Brazil, is another of his many inventions of foreign "facts". Mizner, who never went to Brazil nor knew Brazilians, simply made it up because the name "Botafogo" ("mouth of fire") sounded impressive, as was the concept of imitating Rio de Janeiro. (The only street in Rio de Janeiro anything like the supposed picture, actually an artist's conception, of "Botafogo" that Mizner included in his first catalogue, is the :pt:Canal do Mangue, which runs down the middle of two streets, but is nowhere near Botafogo, a more elegant name than Mangue "mangrove".)

Only  of the road was built (although the street has subsequently been extended to the west at normal scale). According to drawings, the centerpiece of the street was to be a canal for pleasure boats; it was never built.

His first buildings in Boca Raton were his Administrative Buildings, on El Camino Real (in 2018 the Addison Restaurant), and a small hotel to house interested investors. Mizner designed Boca's first town hall/police station/fire station/library, although the design actually built is much smaller and less expensive than what Mizner planned. Today (2018) it is the Boca Raton History Museum, which houses Boca's Welcome Center and the Boca Raton Historical Society.

The hotel was his Ritz-Carlton Cloister Inn, built in 1926, later renamed the Boca Raton Resort & Club, and is one of the only "5 star" hotels in Florida. The 1969 addition of its "pink tower" hotel building is visible from miles away as a towering monument on the Intracoastal Waterway.

Because of the end of the Florida land boom of the 1920s and the 1926 Miami hurricane, the Mizner Development Corporation went into bankruptcy in 1927. Little of Mizner's Boca Raton was ever built: his Administration Buildings, the Cloister Inn, 1/2 mile of El Camino Real, the small Dunagan Apartments (demolished), a few houses near the Cloister Inn (demolished), the Spanish Village neighborhood, and a few small houses in what is now the Old Floresta Historic District neighborhood.

World War II Army Air Force Base
During World War II, some of the land used by the Japanese farmers of the Yamato Colony was confiscated and used as the site of the Boca Raton Army Air Force Base, a major training facility for B-29 bomber crews and the only facility in the U.S. training radar operators. Much of the Boca Raton Army Airfield was later donated to Palm Beach County and became the grounds of Florida Atlantic University. Many of FAU's parking lots are former runways of the airbase. When viewed from above, the site's layout for its previous use as an airfield is plainly evident. Boca Raton Airport's runway was once part of the original airbase, and is still active to this day, although the runway has been rebuilt. Army School Building #3 (T-604) of the Army Air Forces Base has survived as the office building for the Cynthia Gardens apartment complex on Northwest 4th Avenue.

Post-World War II history
Boca Raton was the site of two now vanished amusement parks, Africa U.S.A. (1953–1961) and Ancient America (1953–1959). Africa U.S.A. was a wild animal park in which tourists rode a "Jeep Safari Train" through the park. There were no fences separating the animals from the tourists. It is now the Camino Gardens subdivision one mile west of the Boca Raton Hotel. A red wooden bridge and remnants from the Watusi Geyser and Zambezi Falls, a 30-foot waterfall, from Africa USA can still be seen at the entrance to Camino Gardens. Ancient America was built surrounding a real Native American burial mound. Today, the mound is still visible within the Boca Marina & Yacht Club neighborhood on U.S. 1 near Yamato Road.

IBM
In the late 1960s, IBM announced their intentions to open a manufacturing plant in the area. In 1965, well before the extension of I-95 into Southern Florida, IBM, working in secret with the Arvida corporation, quietly purchased several hundred acres of real estate west of the CSX rail line and northwest of Florida Atlantic University. Originally situated in unincorporated Palm Beach County, the site was annexed into Boca Raton almost a year following its dedication in 1970.

Construction of IBM's main complex began in 1967, designed by Marcel Breuer, and the manufacturing and office complex was dedicated in March 1970. The campus was designed with self-sufficiency in mind and sported its own electrical substation, water pumping station, and rail spur.

By 1984 IBM was Palm Beach County's largest corporate employer, with 8,500 Boca Raton employees. Among other noteworthy IT accomplishments, such as the mass production of the System/360 and development of the Series/1 mainframe computers, IBM's main complex was the birthplace of the IBM PC, which later evolved into the IBM Personal System/2, developed in nearby Delray Beach. Starting in 1987, IBM relocated its manufacturing for what became the IBM PC division to Research Triangle Park in Raleigh, North Carolina, and converted the manufacturing facilities into offices and laboratories, later producing products such as the OS/2 operating system and VoiceType Dictation, later known as ViaVoice voice-recognition software.

IBM maintained its facilities in the South Florida area until 1996, when the facility was closed and sold to Blue Lake Real Estate. The site was sold to T-REX Management Consortium, then to the Blackstone Group in 2005, who renamed it the Boca Corporate Center and Campus.  The site was later renamed the Boca Raton Innovation Campus (BRiC). Crocker Partners, noted for its development of Mizner Park and Office Depot headquarters, purchased BRiC in April 2018.

What used to be IBM's Building 051, an annex separated from the former main IBM campus by Spanish River Boulevard, was donated to the Palm Beach County School District and converted into Don Estridge High Tech Middle School. It is named after Don Estridge, whose team was responsible for developing the IBM PC. IBM returned in July 2001, opening the software development laboratory at Beacon Square off Congress Avenue.

It is noteworthy that still left standing inside the old IBM complex is the office and conference table where Bill Gates signed his historic deal to supply IBM with the Microsoft MS-DOS operating system for its personal computer line.

Suburban expansion
In the 1980s, because of an explosion of development to the west of the historical center of the city, some eastern areas began to decay, including the downtown corridor. For instance, the old Boca Raton Mall, a shopping mall in the downtown area, was beginning to experience higher vacancy, and occupancy by marginal tenants, owing to the opening of Town Center at Boca Raton west of the city in 1980.

In 1991, the new downtown outdoor shopping and dining center, Mizner Park, was completed over the site of the old Boca Raton Mall. It has since become a cultural center for southern Palm Beach County. Featuring a landscaped central park between the two main roads (collectively called Plaza Real) with stores only on the outside of the roads, Mizner Park resembles a Mediterranean suburban "town center" with a more contemporary look. It features many restaurants and is home to the Boca Raton Museum of Art, which moved to the new facility in 2001. In 2002, a new amphitheater was built, replacing a smaller one and providing a large-capacity outdoor venue where concerts and other performances are held. The Mizner Park Cultural Center, an indoor performing arts/comedy show theater is located to the southwest of the amphitheater within the Mizner Park property.

Mizner Park has significantly aided downtown revitalization. Many new eight- to ten-story mixed-use buildings have been constructed, are under construction, or are proposed for the downtown area. The surrounding areas to the downtown have benefited from the downtown redevelopment.

The National Cartoon Museum built a  facility on the southwest edge of Mizner Park in 1996. Open for six years, the museum relocated to its original home in New York City in 2002. Building renovations for public uses, including the local public TV station, and private uses, such as a locally owned and operated bookstore, were completed in 2008. In addition to the Mizner Park Cultural Arts Association's theater and space, the building is home to the Schmidt Family Foundation.

As development continued to focus to the west of the city in the 1980s and 1990s, the mall area known as Town Center at Boca Raton became the geographic center of what is referred to as West Boca Raton, though this mall was not annexed into the city until 2004.

Today, Boca Raton is said to be the Beverly Hills of Florida with well-developed beach resorts, luxury country clubs, and five-star shopping and restaurants. Forbes ranked Boca's Royal Palm Yacht and Country Club the third most exclusive gated communities in the US in 2017. Many mansions and estates have been built and reflect the high real estate values. 18.1% of homes for sale are within the $655,000–$966,000 range, 8.5% in the $966,000–$1.288 million range, and 11.9% in the $1.288 million plus range. Since the mid-2010s, there has been a developing boom such as the building of the Mandarin Oriental's Residences, remodeling of Downtown Boca Raton's Mizner Park, and development around Florida Atlantic University and Lynn University.

A new gated community called Royal Palm Polo was annexed to the City of Boca Raton, which is the only jurisdiction north of Clint Moore Road.

Politics

The City of Boca Raton has a Council-Manager form of government.

The Mayor has been chosen through a direct election since 1978. The offices of the city council and the mayor are nonpartisan. The previous mayor was Susan Haynie. As of January 2021, Democrat Ted Deutch represents Florida's 22nd congressional district, which includes the most northern point of Boca Raton and extends south through Palm Beach County. The district then continues into Broward County communities like Coral Springs, Parkland, and Margate, down to Fort Lauderdale.

In the 2016 and 2020 General Presidential Elections, Republican Donald Trump won in Boca Raton by a majority.

On April 27, 2018, Governor Rick Scott suspended Susan Haynie due to felony and misdemeanor charges brought against her for corruption and bribery. (She would later plead guilty to two of the counts, avoiding jail time.) Scott Singer was appointed mayor and held that position on that basis until the August 28th special election; Singer was elected outright as mayor in that election.

 George Long, 1924–1925
 John Brown, 1925–1929
 Fred Aiken, 1929–1938
 Joe Mitchell, 1938–1950
 Bill O'Donnell, 1950–1951
 Louie Zimmerman, 1951–1952
 Bill Day, 1952–1953, 1954–1954
 Harold Turner, 1953–1954, 1954–1955
 Bill Herbold, 1955–1956
 Roy Shores, 1956–1958
 Hal Dane, 1958–1959
 Joe Delong, 1959–1960, 1963–1964
 Courtney Boone, 1960–1961
 Leo Fox, 1961–1962
 John Brandt, 1962–1963
 Harold Maull, 1964–1965, 1968–1969
 Pat Honchell, 1966–1967
 Nardy Turner, 1967–1968
 Emil Danciu, 1969–1970, 1987–1993
 Tore Wallin, 1970–1971
 Norm Wymbs, 1971
 Bill Miller, 1971–1972
 Byrd Marshall, 1972–1973, 1975–1976, 1978
 Al Alford, 1973–1974
 Dick Houpana, 1974–1975, 1977
 Byrd Marshall, 1972–1973, 1975–1976, 1978
 Dorothy Wilken, 1976–1977
 Jeff Milner, 1977–1981
 Bill Konrad, 1981–1987
 Bill Smith, 1993–1995
 Carol Hanson, 1995–2001
 Steven L. Abrams, 2001–2008
 Susan Whelchel, 2008–2014
 Susan Haynie, 2014–2018
 Scott Singer, 2018–present

City Council Elections – March 14, 2017

Mayor – Haynie vs. Zucaro

Seat A – Singer vs. Dervishi

Seat B – O'Rourke vs. Thomson vs. Gentile

City Council Elections – March 13, 2018

Seat C – Rodgers vs. Do 

Seat D – Mayotte vs. Grossman vs. Preste

Geography

Boca Raton is a "principal city" (as defined by the Census Bureau) of the Miami metropolitan area. Approximately 1 square mile is on the barrier island Deerfield Beach Island (DBI), also colloquially known as Deerfield Cay. Like other South Florida cities, Boca Raton has a water table that does not permit building basements, however plumbing and sewage is constructed underneath the homes and streets, in addition to electrical systems in some areas. There are several high points in the city, such as 4th Avenue which is aptly named "High Street."

Several small tunnels run under roads in Boca, but the roads are built up several feet at these locations, or are on dunes. Several of these tunnels are under State Road A1A at Spanish River Park, from the west side of the road where parking is available to beachgoers, to the east side of the road, which is where the beach is located. A1A is already higher than the surrounding land here due to sand dunes formed by erosion and other natural features.

Neighborhoods
Pearl City is a neighborhood in Boca Raton, immediately north of downtown and within city limits. The neighborhood was originally platted on May 30, 1915 for the blue-collar African Americans employed at the Boca Raton Resort and similar establishments, on area farms, in construction, and various other jobs.

Climate
Boca Raton has a tropical rainforest climate (Köppen climate classification Af), as its driest month (December) averages 62.5mm of precipitation, narrowly meeting the minimum standard of 60mm in the driest month to qualify for that designation. In general the climate is warm and sunny much of the year, although daily thundershowers occur in the hot season from June through September. Boca Raton is frost free. The warm tropical climate in South Florida supports the growth of tropical trees and plants.

Winter high temperatures are typically in the 75–83 degrees range, while summer high temperatures are about 87–92 degrees.

Neighboring cities
 Parkland, Florida
 Delray Beach, Florida
 Deerfield Beach, Florida

Demographics

Boca Raton is known for its affluent and educated social community and high income demographic. According to Forbes, Boca Raton has three of the ten most expensive gated communities in the U.S. The Royal Palm Yacht and Country Club holds the #1 spot, The Sanctuary takes #6, and Le Lac takes the #8 spot.

Boca Raton and other parts of Palm Beach County have a significant Jewish population. Certain areas of outside of Boca Raton city limits, such as the Sandalfoot Cove community, have significant populations of Brazilian and other Latino immigrants.

2020 census

As of the 2020 United States census, there were 97,422 people, 40,845 households, and 23,211 families residing in the city. The median age was approximately 48 years old and the median household income was $88,828. The employment rate was 54.4% and 56.1% of the population had a bachelor's degree of higher. English was the only language spoken at home by 74.9% of the population, while Spanish was spoken by 11.6%.

Culture and attractions

Old Floresta Historic District has several historic houses listed on the National Register of Historic Places.

Boca Raton is home to the Wick Theatre & Costume Museum.

Festivals and events
The Boca Raton Bowl is a National Collegiate Athletic Association (NCAA) sanctioned Division I college football bowl game that features the Mid-American Conference (MAC) facing off against an opponent from the American Athletic Conference (AAC) or Conference USA (C-USA) in alternating years. Each conference participates four times during the six-year agreement, which began with the 2014 season. The Bowl is held at the FAU Stadium.

St. Mark Greek Orthodox Church in Boca Raton hosts a popular Greek festival during the last weekend of January. An estimated 15,000 people attended the festival in 2018.

Additionally, the town hosts the "Festival of the Arts BOCA" annually during the spring, and the Brazilian Beat Festival in the fall.

Mizner Park
Mizner Park is a lifestyle center in downtown Boca Raton. The area contains several stores and fashion boutiques, restaurants, an iPic movie theater, and housing. The Center for the Arts at Mizner Park is on the development's north end, which includes the Boca Raton Museum of Art and the Count de Hoernele Amphitheater. Royal Palm Place is adjacent to Mizner Park, and it contains upscale shopping, restaurants, and apartments.

Town Center Mall
Town Center at Boca Raton is an upscale super-regional shopping center in Boca Raton that is the largest enclosed and conventional shopping mall within Palm Beach County, and the third largest by square feet in South Florida, behind Sawgrass Mills and Aventura Mall.

In 1999, the Simon Property Group bought Town Center at Boca Raton and began building a new wing on its southeastern side, and completed renovations in 2018.

Seritage Growth Properties plans to build a lifestyle center called The Collection at Boca Town Center which will provide shopping, dining, and entertainment.

Crocker Partners will build a Restaurant Row near the mall.

Beaches and parks

Boca Raton's eastern coast has two miles of beaches, notably Red Reef Park and South Inlet Park.

Red Reef Park has the Gumbo Limbo Environmental Complex, an environmental education center. Founded in 1984, Gumbo Limbo is a cooperative project of the City of Boca Raton, Greater Boca Raton Beach and Park District, Florida Atlantic University, and Friends of Gumbo Limbo. In addition to the sea tanks, butterfly garden and boardwalk trail through the hammocks complete with an observation tower, Gumbo Limbo also houses a research facility run by FAU where students study coral reefs, sea turtles, sharks, sea grass and other marine-related subjects.

Sugar Sand Park is a municipal park in Boca Raton. It contains the Children's Science Explorium. Another park is the Burt Aaronson South County Regional Park in West Boca Raton. The park contains several amenities, including the Osprey Point Golf Course, a dog park, the Sunset Cove Amphitheater, the Coconut Cove Waterpark, and the Daggerwing Nature Center. Spanish River Park is a family-friendly city park along the Intracoastal Waterway for picnicking, swimming & bird-watching.

Economy

Office Depot, a supplier of office products and services, has its global headquarters on a 28-acre campus in the city. The GEO Group, also has its headquarters in Boca Raton based out of One Park Place. Media company Friend Finder Networks, consumer products company Jarden and e-retailer Vitacost, and BMI Gaming are also based in Boca Raton.

Top employers
According to the City's 2017 Comprehensive Annual Financial Report, the top employers in the city are:

Education

Public schools
Public education is provided and managed by The School District of Palm Beach County, the thirteenth-largest public school district in the United States. Boca Raton is also home to several notable private and religious schools.

As of 2007, Boca Raton was served by four public high schools. Within the city's limits, Boca Raton Community High School serves the eastern part of the city. Spanish River Community High School serves the west-central part of the city limits and parts of unincorporated Boca Raton. Olympic Heights Community High School and West Boca Raton Community High School serve the western unincorporated areas. Spanish River, Olympic Heights, and West Boca Raton also serve students from Delray Beach and Boynton Beach.

The area is served by five public middle schools. Don Estridge High Tech Middle School is a technology magnet school named for Don Estridge, the leader of a small group of engineers who developed the IBM Personal Computer in Boca Raton. The other four public middle schools are Boca Raton Community Middle School, Eagles Landing Middle School, Loggers' Run Community Middle School, and Omni Middle School.

The area is served by twelve public elementary schools:

Alternative schooling

Two alternatives to the Palm Beach County Public Schools in Boca Raton are the K–8 Alexander D. Henderson University School (ADHUS) and FAU High School (FAUHS). Both are on the Florida Atlantic University campus and are organized as a unique and separate school district; they are not part of the Palm Beach County School System. Henderson School is recognized as Florida Atlantic University School District #72, under the College of Education's administrative oversight.

University schools in Florida are authorized to provide instruction for grades K–12 and university students, support university research efforts, and test educational reforms for Florida schools. Both ADHUS and FAUHS are public schools and thus do not charge tuition. And they are open to children who reside in Palm Beach County or Broward County. ADHUS admission is by lottery, while FAUHS admission is determined by academic ability. Student characteristics of gender, race, family income and student ability are used to match the student population profile to that of the state.

FAU High School is a dual-enrollment program that involves itself primarily in collegiate classes. Students in ninth grade take advanced classes at the ADHUS sister campus, while students in higher grades attend only collegiate classes on Florida Atlantic University's campus, earning dual credit for both high school and college. A student who has successfully completed all four years at FAU High School will graduate having completed three years of university study on a college campus.

Private schools
Private schools in Boca Raton accelerated in demand in the early 2020s as Wall Street moved many employees and offices to the South Florida area.

Higher education
Florida Atlantic University (FAU), founded in 1961, held its first classes in Boca Raton in 1964. FAU is a member of the State University System of Florida and is the largest university in Boca Raton. It has over 29,000 students, 3,555 of which are residential students, and a Division I athletics program. In recognition of the rapid growth of Boca Raton's universities, in particular FAU, the city of Boca Raton has recently been referred to as a "burgeoning college town."

Lynn University is a four-year co-educational institution renamed to honor the Lynn (Eugene & Christine) family who continue to be benefactors of the university; its Digital Media Arts College, founded in 2001, offers bachelor's and master's degrees in computer animation and graphic design.

Palm Beach State College has its Boca Raton campus adjacent to Florida Atlantic University since 1983. When it was opened, it was named Palm Beach Junior College. In 1988 it changed its name to Palm Beach Community College, and in 2009, to Palm Beach State College.

Everglades University has its main campus in Boca Raton.

Libraries
The Boca Raton Public Library serves city of Boca Raton residents. A second municipal library building on Spanish River Boulevard west of I-95 opened in January 2008. The Glades Road Branch Library and the West Boca Branch Library of the Palm Beach County Library System serve Boca Raton residents who live outside the city limits.

County library card holders may use any of the sixteen branches in the Palm Beach County Library System and have access to many databases and downloadable e-books and audio books.

Crime
The City of Boca Raton is one of the safest cities in Palm Beach County, with a crime rate 38% lower than the entire state of Florida.

Boca Raton has a connection to the Mafia. It is known as a popular hangout for many suspected Mafia members. According to a number of US Federal indictments, as of June 2004, the Gambino family continues to operate in Boca Raton. The television show The Sopranos featured the city in its plot ("Boca" and "...To Save Us All From Satan's Power"), and Mafia Wife author Lynda Milito resides in Boca Raton. Joey Merlino, the reputed head of the Philadelphia crime family, also resides in northern Boca Raton.

In 2007, several murders at the Town Center Mall gained national attention. In March, a 52-year-old woman was kidnapped and murdered. In December of the same year, a 47-year-old woman and her 7-year-old daughter were also kidnapped, and later found bound and shot in the head in the woman's SUV in the mall parking lot. This case was featured on America's Most Wanted and caused host John Walsh to say he believed a serial killer to be in the city. Though there is no forensic evidence to suggest the murders were committed by the same person, the similarities in the cases led police to believe they were related. To this day, the murders all remain unsolved.

The Pearl City neighborhood has been known as a drug trafficking hub in the past. In recent years, the city, like most of the county (especially neighboring Delray Beach) has experienced a steady rise in heroin and opioid overdoses.

As of the end of 2019, the crime rate in Boca Raton was down 26% over the preceding 13 years.

Transportation

Air 
The Boca Raton Airport (BCT) is a general aviation airport immediately adjacent to Florida Atlantic University and Interstate 95. It has a control tower which is staffed from 0700 to 2300. The Boca Raton Airport is publicly owned and governed by a seven-member Authority appointed by the City of Boca Raton and the Palm Beach County Commission. The airport is noted for a very high concentration of private jets and charter aviation, and the airspace surrounding the airport is in Class D airspace.

All three of the Miami area's major commercial airports serve Boca Raton, though the city is located about equidistantly between Fort Lauderdale-Hollywood International Airport and Palm Beach International Airport. Most commercial international flights to the region will pass through Miami International Airport, which can be accessed via I-95 and Florida State Route 112 by road or by using Tri-Rail.

Highways
State Road A1A is a north-south road lying between the Intracoastal Waterway and the Atlantic Ocean.
U.S. Highway 1, locally known as "Federal Highway", is a north-south highway passing through the city's downtown, commercial, and industrial districts in the eastern part of the city.
U.S. Highway 441 (also known as State Road 7) is a north-south highway passing through commercial and residential districts west of the city limits.
Interstate 95 bisects the city from north to south with four interchanges serving Boca Raton.
Florida's Turnpike is a north-south highway passing through unincorporated Boca Raton, forming part of the city limits in the north, with one interchange at Glades Road.
Glades Road is an east-west road between US 441 and US 1.
 Other major east-west roads include Palmetto Park Road and Yamato Road.
 Other major north-south roads include Military Trail and Jog Road / Powerline Road (Changes name on Glades Road).

Rail

The Tri-Rail commuter rail system serves the city with its Boca Raton station on the south side of Yamato Road just west of I-95.
Freight service operated by CSX Transportation and Florida East Coast Railway also serve the city.
Brightline has a station adjacent to the Boca Raton Public Library. It provides service to Miami, Fort Lauderdale, West Palm Beach, and Aventura, as well as Orlando and Tampa in the future.

Bus
 PalmTran provides local bus service in the area.

Water

Long before any settlers arrived, the original 1870 government survey of the area showed that just west of and parallel to the Atlantic Ocean's coastal dune was the "Boca Ratones Lagoon", which extended south for  measured from just north of the present location of Atlantic Avenue in Delray Beach. Along the southern half of the lagoon were three wide areas each called a "Lake", which are now named (north to south) Lake Rogers, Lake Wyman, and Lake Boca Raton. At the southeast end of the lagoon was a short protrusion toward the south which would become the Boca Raton Inlet after a sandbar at its mouth was removed.

The lagoon and lakes were part of a half-mile (0.8 km) wide swamp, west of which was scrub land a mile (1.6 km) wide (part of the Atlantic coastal ridge) where the Florida East Coast Railway (1896) and Dixie Highway (1923) were built. To the west of the scrub was a half mile or wider swamp within which flowed north to south the "Prong of Hillsborough River", which is now the El Rio Canal. It now forms the eastern border of Florida Atlantic University and the Old Floresta neighborhood. The prong entered the "Hillsborough River" at the present eastern end of the straight portion of the Hillsboro Canal (dredged 1911–1914), which is the southern city limits. The river flowed southeast in several channels along the western edge of the present Deerfield Island County Park, formerly called Capone Island (named for Al Capone who owned it during the 1930s), which did not become an island until the Royal Palm Canal was dredged along its northern edge in 1961. Flowing south from the lagoon to the river along the eastern edge of the 'island' was a "Small boat Pass into Hillsboro' River", also called the Little Hillsboro. The river continued due south about  just inland of the coastal dune until it emptied into the Atlantic Ocean at the "Hillsborough Bar", now the Hillsboro Inlet.

After 1895, the lagoon and canal were sometimes called the Spanish River. All three versions were subject to shoaling which reduced their depths below the specified minimum. Forming part of the northern city limits is the C-15 canal, connecting the El Rio Canal to the Intracoastal Waterway.

Boca Raton pioneered an innovative means to recycle wastewater that involves selling the recycled water to golf courses, to use for irrigation. This system is called the IRIS system. Instead of pumping the nutrient laden wastewater out to sea, or under the ground into an aquifer, the IRIS system prevents nutrients from ending up in the ocean, reducing Boca Raton's impact on the  problem of toxic algae blooms.

Gallery

See also 
 List of people from Boca Raton
 Boca Raton News

References

Further reading 

 
  1973–
  
 Curl, Donald W. and John P. Johnson. Boca Raton: A Pictorial History. Virginia Beach, VA: Donning Company, 1990.
 Sally J. Ling (2005). Small Town, Big Secrets: Inside the Boca Raton Army Air Field During World War II. History Press. .

External links

 Downtown Boca
 Greater Boca Raton Chamber of Commerce
 
 

 
1895 establishments in Florida
Academic enclaves
Addison Mizner
Beaches of Florida
Beaches of Palm Beach County, Florida
Cities in Florida
Cities in Palm Beach County, Florida
Jews and Judaism in Florida
Populated coastal places in Florida on the Atlantic Ocean
Populated places established in 1895
Seaside resorts in Florida
Planned communities in Florida